Carabus adelphus is a species of ground beetle in the large genus Carabus.

References

adelphus
Insects described in 1892
Insects of Russia